Electoral district of Cumberland may refer to several former districts in Australia:

 Electoral district of Cumberland Boroughs (NSW Legislative Council), New South Wales (1843-1856)
 Electoral district of Cumberland Boroughs, New South Wales (1856–1859)
 Electoral district of Cumberland (North Riding), New South Wales (1856–1859)
 Electoral district of Cumberland (South Riding), New South Wales (1856–1859)
 Electoral district of Cumberland (New South Wales) (1920–1927)
 Electoral district of Cumberland (Tasmania) (1856–1909)